Ectyphinae is a subfamily of mydas flies in the family Mydidae. There are at least four genera in Ectyphinae.

Genera
These genera belong to the subfamily Ectyphinae:
 Ectyphus Gerstaecker, 1868 (South Africa)
 Heteromydas Hardy, 1945 (Mexico and the United States)
 Opomydas Curran, 1934 (Mexico and the United States)
 Parectyphus Hesse, 1972 (Namibia)

References

Further reading

 
 

Mydidae